Abrahan Alfonso Gavilán  (born ) is a Cuban male volleyball player. He was part of the Cuba men's national volleyball team at the 2014 FIVB Volleyball Men's World Championship in Poland. He played for La Habana.
He didn't play in Rio Olympics in 2016 for being one of the six players of the Cuban national volleyball team that were remanded into custody suspected of committing aggravated rape in July 2016 in Tampere, Finland. In September 2016 he was sentenced to five years behind bars.

Clubs
 La Habana (2014)

References

1995 births
Living people
Cuban men's volleyball players
Cuban people imprisoned abroad
Place of birth missing (living people)
Cuban people convicted of rape
Prisoners and detainees of Finland
Expatriates in Finland